Rufus Cole (April 30, 1872 – April 20, 1966) was an American medical doctor and the first director of the Rockefeller University Hospital. Under his leadership significant advances in treatment of bacterial pneumonia and later against tuberculosis were made. In 1912 Cole and Alphonse Dochez developed a serum against Type 1 pneumococcus and also developed a method for testing whether an infection is caused by this or some other type of the bacterium. The New York Times in its obituary for Cole called him "a pioneer in clinical medicine" and "an authority on lobar pneumonia". The New York Times also wrote in the same obituary that Cole was President of Association of American Physicians in 1931, had honorary degrees from the University of Chicago and the National University of Ireland.
Cole received Kober prize in 1938 for advances against tuberculosis. He is also credited by Franklin C. McLean for creating a blueprint for clinical studies.

Early life and education
Cole was born in Rowsburg, Ohio. He graduated from the University of Michigan with an undergraduate degree and from Johns Hopkins University with a M.D. degree in 1899.

Career
Cole became director of the Hospital of the Rockefeller Institute in 1908 and retired in 1937.
During his retirement he wrote a two volume history of 17th century Britain: "Human History, the Seventeenth Century and the Stuart Family", Two Volumes by Rufus Cole (Hardcover – 1959). Cole died of pneumonia in a Washington hospital. He was 93 years old and lived in Mount Kisco, New York.

Distinctions, degrees and memberships

Academic degrees
 University of Michigan, B.S., 1896
 Johns Hopkins University, M.D., 1899
 The University of Chicago, D.Sc. (Honorary), 1927
 National University of Ireland, D.Sc. (Honorary), 1933

Professional appointments
 The Johns Hopkins Hospital
 Resident House Officer, 1899–1900
 Assistant Resident Physician, 1900–1904
 Instructor in Medicine, 1901–1904
 Resident Physician and Associate in Medicine, 1904–1906
 Assistant Physician in charge of the Biological Division of the Clinical Research Laboratory, 1906–1909
 Research Student under Professor A. Wassermann, Robert Koch, Berlin, 1903–1904
Director of the Hospital of the Rockefeller Institute for Medical Research and Member of the Rockefeller Institute, 1908–1937;
Member Emeritus, 1937–1966
 Board of Managers, St Luke's Hospital, New York, 1938–1946
 Board of Manager, Memorial Hospital, New York, 1938–1944
 Advisory Committee, department of Welfare, Westchester County, 1935
 Consultant in Bacteriology, New York State Department of Health, 1936
 Consulting Physician, Willard Parker Hospital, 1912–1920

Awards
 Medaille d'Honneur de l'Assistance Publique de la Republique Francaise, 1926
 Kober Medal, Association of American Physicians, 1938
 Academy Medal, New York Academy of Medicine, 1953
 Kovalenko Award, National Academy of Sciences, 1966 (Posthumously)

References

External links
Biography by C. Phillip Miller
National Academy of Sciences Biographical Memoir

1872 births
1966 deaths
American bacteriologists
People from Ashland County, Ohio
Members of the United States National Academy of Sciences
University of Michigan alumni
American hospital administrators